Jakob Hlasek and Tomáš Šmíd were the defending champions but Hlasek did not compete this year, as he decided to focus on the singles tournament. Šmíd teamed up with Jan Gunnarsson and lost in the first round to tournament runners-up Omar Camporese and Claudio Mezzadri.

Udo Riglewski and Michael Stich won the title by defeating Camporese and Mezzadri 6–3, 4–6, 6–0 in the final.

Seeds

Draw

Draw

References

External links
 Official results archive (ATP)
 Official results archive (ITF)

Swiss Indoors - Singles